Stephanie Faracy is an American actress. She is known for playing supporting roles in films include Heaven Can Wait (1978), Scavenger Hunt (1979), Blind Date (1987), The Great Outdoors (1988), Hocus Pocus (1993), Sideways (2004), Flightplan (2005), and Mike and Dave Need Wedding Dates (2016). On television, Faracy has had leading roles in a number of sitcoms, most significantly True Colors (1990–92). She currently plays "Lisa Lawson", the mother of Neil Patrick Harris' "Michael", on the Netflix comedy series Uncoupled (2022).

Life and career
Faracy was born in Brooklyn, New York, but raised in Elk Grove Village, Illinois, where she attended high school. She studied acting at Illinois Wesleyan University and Yale School of Drama. She began her acting career in New York stage, and in 1976, made her television debut in an episode of ABC sitcom Laverne & Shirley.

She went to star in two unsold sitcom pilots, before playing Corinne in the 1978 comedy film Heaven Can Wait. The following year, Faracy played Angel Childress in the film When You Comin' Back, Red Ryder?, and Babbette in the comedy film Scavenger Hunt.

Faracy has a long-running career on television. From 1979-80, she starred in the CBS sitcom The Last Resort. From 1983 to 1984, she co-starred alongside Bill Bixby and Mariette Hartley in the another CBS sitcom, Goodnight, Beantown. Also during the 1980s, Faracy had roles on the number of miniseries, include The Thorn Birds (1983, as Mary Carson's servant, Judy), Space (1985), and Windmills of the Gods (1988). 

In film, she co-starred alongside Bruce Willis and Kim Basinger in the 1987 romantic comedy film Blind Date, and the following year she played John Candy's wife in the comedy film The Great Outdoors.

In 1990, Faracy starred alongside Martin Mull in the sitcom His & Hers. Later that year, she began starring in the Fox sitcom True Colors about an interracial marriage.

In 1993, she played the role of "Jenny Dennison" in the film Hocus Pocus opposite Bette Midler, Kathy Najimy, and Sarah Jessica Parker.

The following years, Faracy continued her career, appearing in supporting roles in both film and television. She has guest-starred on Touched by an Angel, Wings, Murphy Brown, Will & Grace, Frasier, Grey's Anatomy, Ugly Betty, How I Met Your Mother, Castle, Desperate Housewives, Modern Family, How to Get Away with Murder, and The Goldbergs. In 2016, she had a recurring role on the Lifetime comedy-drama series Devious Maids. In 2022, she played "Lisa Lawson", the mother of Neil Patrick Harris' "Michael", on the Netflix comedy series Uncoupled.

Her recent notable film credits include Sideways (2004) as Sandra Oh's mother, Surviving Christmas (2004) with Ben Affleck and James Gandolfini, Flightplan (2005) with Jodie Foster, Get Him to the Greek (2010) with Russell Brand and Jonah Hill, Bad Teacher (2011) as "Mrs. Pubich" opposite Cameron Diaz, and Mike and Dave Need Wedding Dates (2016) as Zac Efron's mother.

Filmography

Film

Television

References

External links
 

20th-century American actresses
21st-century American actresses
Actresses from New York City
American film actresses
American television actresses
Living people
People from Brooklyn
People from Elk Grove Village, Illinois
Illinois Wesleyan University alumni
Yale School of Drama alumni
Year of birth missing (living people)